Shakunthala Thimmappa Shetty (born 1 March 1947) is an Indian politician and a former member of the legislative assembly of Karnataka. Representing Puttur at the assembly, she was elected as a member from the Bharatiya Janata Party first and the Indian National Congress in her second term. She retired from electoral politics following her defeat at the 2018 election.

Career 
Shetty joined the Indian National Congress after she was expelled from the Bharatiya Janata Party in May 2008.

Film 
Shakunthala Shetty played the lead role in a Tulu film Kanchilda Baale.

References

1947 births
Living people
Tulu people
Indian National Congress politicians from Karnataka
People from Dakshina Kannada district
21st-century Indian women politicians
21st-century Indian politicians
Bharatiya Janata Party politicians from Karnataka
Karnataka MLAs 2004–2007
Karnataka MLAs 2013–2018
Women members of the Karnataka Legislative Assembly